Aldin Spahović is a Bosnian volleyball player at national and international level. He was born in Goražde, Bosnia and Herzegovina.

He played as Spiker/Opposite for Bosnia's most successful volleyball club OK Kakanj, as a member of the Premier League of Volleyball of Bosnia and Herzegovina national championship winning team in 2003 and in the National Cup of Bosnia and Herzegovina winning team in 2002 and 2003.

Clubs

References

Bosnia and Herzegovina men's volleyball players
Kakanj
1979 births
Living people
People from Goražde